This is an article of notable issues relating to the terrestrial environment of Earth in 2020. They relate to environmental events such as natural disasters, environmental sciences such as ecology and geoscience with a known relevance to contemporary influence of humanity on Earth, environmental law, conservation, environmentalism with major worldwide impact and environmental issues.

Events

 MT New Diamond

Environmental disasters

Environmental sciences

Geosciences, biotechnology, anthropology and geoengineering

Environmental policy 

From 1 January 2020, ships will only be permitted to use fuel oil with a very low sulfur content. The International Maritime Organization estimates that the new limit of 0.5% sulfur content, down from 3.5%, will cut sulfur dioxide emissions from ships by about 8.5 million tonnes.

The Pacific nation of Palau bans sun cream that is harmful to corals and sea life in January 2020.

COVID-19 pandemic 

In February - March 2020 campaigners say that governments should act with the same urgency on climate as on the coronavirus. The health crisis is reducing carbon emissions more than any policy.
 Global air traffic decreased by 4.3% in February 2020 with cancellations of tens of thousands of flights to affected areas.
 Chinese measures against coronavirus in Feb 2020 reduced coal consumption at power plants 36%, oil refining capacity 34% and satellite-based NO2 levels 37%.
US seafood imports and exports for fresh products dropped during the pandemic while frozen products were less affected. Demand for seafood at restaurants also dropped but there were increases in seafood delivery and takeout.

For further information see the tag [COVID-19] above.

Predicted and scheduled events

International goals 
A list of − mostly self-imposed and legally voluntary or unenforceable − goals due by 2020 as decided by multinational corporate associations and international governance entities and their status:

See also

 2020s in environmental history
 2020 in climate change
List of large volcanic eruptions in the 21st century
Energy development
Timeline of solar cells#2020
2020 in space
Lists of extinct animals#Recent extinction
:Category:Species described in 2020
:Category:Protected areas established in 2020
Human impact on the environment
List of environmental issues
Outline of environmental studies

References

 
Environmental